The Zagreb Open was a professional tennis tournament played on outdoor red clay courts. It was part of the Association of Tennis Professionals (ATP) Challenger Tour and the International Tennis Federation (ITF) Women's Circuit. It was held annually at the Sportski Park Mladost in Zagreb, Croatia, from 1996 to 2011.

Tom Vanhoudt is the doubles record holder with two titles, along with Ágnes Szávay on the women's counterpart.

Past finals

Men

Singles

Doubles

Women

Singles

Doubles

External links
Official website
ITF search

 
ATP Challenger Tour
ITF Women's World Tennis Tour
Clay court tennis tournaments
Sport in Zagreb
Recurring sporting events established in 1996
Recurring sporting events disestablished in 2011
Defunct sports competitions in Croatia
Tennis tournaments in Croatia